Ahmad Alaadeen (July 24, 1934 – August 15, 2010) was an American jazz saxophonist and educator whose career spanned over six decades. A longtime fixture on the Kansas City jazz scene, Aladeen came to wider prominence in the 1990s with a series of self-released albums featuring his swing- and hard bop-oriented compositions that led Allmusic critic Scott Yanow to declare that the saxophonist "deserves to be much better known."

Discography 
 and the beauty of it all – Alaadeen – 'ASR Records – Kansas City (2007)
 New Africa Suite – Alaadeen – 'ASR Records – Kansas City (2005)
 With This Voice – Luqman Hamza – Alaadeen featured – Groove Note Records – Recorded in Lenexa, KS (2000)
 Louis Neal Big Band – Alaadeen featured – Kansas City, MO (1999)
 Taken By Surprise – Norman Hedman's Tropique – Alaadeen featured – New York, NY (1999)
 It's A Wonderful World – Alaadeen with Jay McShann – Groove Note Records, Los Angeles, CA – Recorded in Lenexa, KS (1999)
 Time Through The Ages – Alaadeen – 'ASR 2001 (1997) – Kansas City, MO
 Alaadeen and The Deans of Swing Plays Blues For RC and Josephine, too – Alaadeen – 'ASR 1001 (1995) – Kansas City, MO
 Live Jazz on the Plaza – Alaadeen – Fandeen Publishing Company (1990) – Kansas City, MO
 Clear Sounds of Kansas City – Sprint (1989) – Kansas City, MO
 Bright Lights – Big City – Alaadeen with the City Lights Jazz Ensemble – Accent Music (1988) – Kansas City, MO
 Tain't What Cha Do, It's The Way How Cha Do IT – Alaadeen with the City Light Orchestra – City Light Records (1986) – Kansas City, MO
 Raised Spirits – Alaadeen with the City Light Orchestra – City Light Records (1984) – Kansas City, MO
 Come Back Baby – Federal 12266 – Linda Hopkins – Kansas City, Feb. 9th 1956 – 78"
 I'm Going To Cry You – Right Out Of My Mind – Federal 12266 – Linda Hopkins – Kansas City, - Feb. 9th 1956 – 78"
 Mama Needs – Your Loving Baby – Federal – 12365 – Linda Hopkins – Kansas City, Feb. 9th 1956 – 78"
 Danny Boy – Federal 12365 – Linda Hopkins – Kansas City, Feb. 9th 1956 – 78"
 Eatin' Watermelon – Alaadeen with Crown Prince Waterford and Jimmy Witherspoon (1950s)

References

External links 
Google: Ahmad Alaadeen
Mutual Musicians Foundation – past chair
American Jazz Museum – featured Blue Room Musician
Jazz Journalist Association article
Riverfront Times (St. Louis) article

1934 births
2010 deaths
Swing saxophonists
Hard bop saxophonists
DePaul University alumni
Juilliard School alumni
American jazz saxophonists
American male saxophonists
Musicians from Kansas City, Missouri
Deaths from bladder cancer
African-American jazz musicians
United States Army Band musicians
Jazz musicians from Missouri
American male jazz musicians
Deaths from cancer in Kansas
20th-century African-American people
21st-century African-American people
20th-century American saxophonists